The Watcher is an American anthology drama series created by Christopher Crowe that premiered on UPN on January 17, 1995 and ended on June 7, 1995, during the network's inaugural season. The series aired Tuesday night at 9:00 p.m Eastern time.

Synopsis
Set in Las Vegas, the series stars rapper Sir Mix-a-Lot as "The Watcher", an omniscient narrator who watches the activities of others all throughout the city of Las Vegas via all the monitors in his suite at the  Riviera Hotel which are filming live from the hidden cameras all throughout the city. The Watcher also starred Bobbie Phillips as Lori Danforth, a limo driver.

The Watcher was one of five series that aired on UPN during its first year, joining other drama series Star Trek: Voyager and Marker and the sitcoms Pig Sty and Platypus Man. Like the latter three series, it was canceled following its one and only season.

Guest stars
Guest stars include comedian and Howard Stern Show regular Jackie "The Jokeman" Martling, Max Wright, and comedians Gilbert Gottfried and D.L. Hughley, as well as the band Cheap Trick.

Episodes

References

External links
 

1995 American television series debuts
1995 American television series endings
1990s American anthology television series
English-language television shows
Television series by CBS Studios
Television series created by Christopher Crowe (screenwriter)
Television shows set in the Las Vegas Valley
UPN original programming